Katakwi District is a district in the Eastern Region of Uganda. The town of Katakwi is the site of the district headquarters.

Location
Katakwi District is bordered by Napak District to the north, Nakapiripirit District to the east, Kumi District to the south, Ngora District and Soroti District to the southwest and Amuria District to the west. The coordinates of the district are:01 54N, 34 00E.

Overview
Katakwi District was created in 1997. It was formerly part of Soroti District. The district is located in the Teso sub-region, home to an estimated 2.5 million people of Iteso and Kumam ethnicities, according to the 2002 national census. In June 2005, the western part of the district was carved out to create Amuria District. The eight Ugandan districts that constitute Teso sub-region are:

Population
In 1991, the population of Katakwi District was estimated at 75,200. The national census in 2002 estimated the population of the district at 118,900. The calculated population growth rate in the district is 4.3%. In 2012, the district population was estimated at 176,800.

Economic activities
Subsistence agriculture and pastoral animal husbandry are the two main economic activities in Katakwi District. In recent years, attempts to start commercial agriculture have been initiated. Crops grown include the following:

Prominent people
Some of the prominent people from the district, include the following:
 Major (Retired) Jessica Alupo - Current Minister of Education & Sports in Uganda's Cabinet  
 Proscovia Alengot Oromait - Current Member of Parliament for "Usuk County", Katakwi District. The youngest person to be elected to parliament on the African continent at age 19, in 2012.

See also

References

External links
 Katakwi District Information Portal

 
Districts of Uganda
Teso sub-region
Eastern Region, Uganda